The 2021–22 UEFA Champions League knockout phase began on 15 February with the round of 16 and ended on 28 May 2022 with the final at the Stade de France in Saint-Denis, France, to decide the champions of the 2021–22 UEFA Champions League. A total of 16 teams competed in the knockout phase.

Times are CET/CEST, as listed by UEFA (local times, if different, are in parentheses).

Qualified teams
The knockout phase involved the 16 teams which qualified as winners and runners-up of each of the eight groups in the group stage.

Format
Each tie in the knockout phase, apart from the final, was played over two legs, with each team playing one leg at home. The team that scored more goals on aggregate over the two legs advanced to the next round. If the aggregate score was level, then 30 minutes of extra time was played (the away goals rule was not applied). If the score was still level at the end of extra time, the winners were decided by a penalty shoot-out. In the final, which was played as a single match, if the score was level at the end of normal time, extra time was played, followed by a penalty shoot-out if the score was still level.

The mechanism of the draws for each round was as follows:
In the draw for the round of 16, the eight group winners were seeded, and the eight group runners-up were unseeded. The seeded teams were drawn against the unseeded teams, with the seeded teams hosting the second leg. Teams from the same group or the same association could not be drawn against each other.
In the draws for the quarter-finals and semi-finals, there were no seedings, and teams from the same group or the same association could be drawn against each other. As the draws for the quarter-finals and semi-finals were held together before the quarter-finals were played, the identity of the quarter-final winners was not known at the time of the semi-final draw. A draw was also held to determine which semi-final winner was designated as the "home" team for the final (for administrative purposes as it was played at a neutral venue).

Schedule
The schedule was as follows (all draws were held at the UEFA headquarters in Nyon, Switzerland).

Bracket

Round of 16

The draw for the round of 16 was held on 13 December 2021, originally at 12:00 CET. The draw featured multiple irregularities: Manchester United were mistakenly included in the draw for Villarreal's opponent (both were in Group F), and subsequently were selected; another ball was then drawn, with Manchester City chosen instead. In the following tie, Liverpool were mistakenly included in the draw for Atlético Madrid's opponent (both were in Group B), while Manchester United were incorrectly excluded. Later that day, UEFA voided the original draw due to a "technical problem" with the draw computer, and it was entirely redone at 15:00 CET.

The round of 16 ties were initially drawn (and later voided) as follows:
Benfica – Real Madrid
Villarreal – Manchester City
Atlético Madrid – Bayern Munich
Red Bull Salzburg – Liverpool
Inter Milan – Ajax
Sporting CP – Juventus
Chelsea – Lille
Paris Saint-Germain – Manchester United

Summary

The first legs were played on 15, 16, 22 and 23 February, and the second legs were played on 8, 9, 15 and 16 March 2022.

|}

Matches

Bayern Munich won 8–2 on aggregate.

Manchester City won 5–0 on aggregate.

Benfica won 3–2 on aggregate.

Chelsea won 4–1 on aggregate.

Atlético Madrid won 2–1 on aggregate.

Villarreal won 4–1 on aggregate.

Liverpool won 2–1 on aggregate.

Real Madrid won 3–2 on aggregate.

Quarter-finals

The draw for the quarter-finals was held on 18 March 2022, 12:00 CET.

Summary

The first legs were played on 5 and 6 April, and the second legs were played on 12 and 13 April 2022.

|}

Matches

Real Madrid won 5–4 on aggregate.

Manchester City won 1–0 on aggregate.

Villarreal won 2–1 on aggregate.

Liverpool won 6–4 on aggregate.

Semi-finals

The draw for the semi-finals was held on 18 March 2022, 12:00 CET, after the quarter-final draw.

Summary

The first legs were played on 26 and 27 April, and the second legs were played on 3 and 4 May 2022.

|}

Matches

Real Madrid won 6–5 on aggregate.

Liverpool won 5–2 on aggregate.

Final

The final was played on 28 May 2022 at the Stade de France in Saint-Denis. A draw was held on 18 March 2022, after the quarter-final and semi-final draws, to determine the "home" team for administrative purposes.

Notes

References

External links

3
2021-22
February 2022 sports events in Europe
March 2022 sports events in Europe
April 2022 sports events in Europe
May 2022 sports events in Europe